This is a list of universities and specialized institutions in El Salvador.

Universities

Public
 University of El Salvador, UES

Private
José Matías Delgado University, UJMD
Francisco Gavidia University, UFG
José Simeón Cañas Central American University, UCA El Salvador
Universidad Albert Einstein, UAE
Universidad Autónoma de Santa Ana, UNASA
Universidad Católica de El Salvador, UNICAES
Universidad Cristiana de las Asambleas de Dios, UCAD
Universidad de Nueva San Salvador UNSSA 
Universidad de Oriente (El Salvador), UNIVO
Universidad de Sonsonate, USO
Universidad Don Bosco, UDB 
Universidad Dr. Andrés Bello, UAB
Universidad Evangélica de El Salvador, UEES
Universidad Gerardo Barrios, UGB
Universidad Internacional Nehemias, NIU
Universidad Luterana Salvadoreña, ULS
Universidad Modular Abierta, UMA
Universidad Monseñor Oscar Arnulfo Romero, UMOAR
Universidad Panamericana de El Salvador, UPAN
Universidad Pedagógica de El Salvador
Universidad Politécnica de El Salvador, UPESS
Universidad Salvadoreña Alberto Masferrer, USAM
Universidad Técnica Latinoamericana, UTLA
Universidad Tecnológica de El Salvador, UTEC

Specialized institutions

Public
Escuela Especializada en Ingeniería FEPADE, ITCA-FEPADE
Escuela Militar Capitán General Gerardo Barrios
 Escuela Nacional de Agricultura "Roberto Quiñónez", ENA
Escuela Superior Franciscana Especializada AGAPE, ESFE/AGAPE

Private
Escuela de Comunicación Mónica Herrera
Escuela Superior de Economia y Negocios, ESEN
Instituto Superior de Economía y Administración de Empresas FEPADE, ISEADE-FEPADE
Santa Ana Escuela de enfermería, Santa Ana
Gran Universidad, San Salvador
TECH Technological University

See also

 Education in El Salvador

References

Universities
El Salvador
El Salvador